Red Hill is a suburb of Perth, Western Australia.  It has Toodyay Road pass through it on the way up the Darling Scarp. It is in the City of Swan local government area.  At the 2011 Australian Census the suburb recorded a population of 98.

The suburb includes a regional landfill, Red Hill Waste Management Facility, which is managed by the Eastern Metropolitan Regional Council.

References

Suburbs of Perth, Western Australia
Darling Range
Suburbs and localities in the City of Swan